"Blah, Blah, Blah" is a 1931 song with music by George Gershwin, to lyrics by his brother Ira Gershwin. Originally written for the abortive East is West it was taken "out of the trunk" by the Gershwins for the 1931 film Delicious. It was later used in the 2012 Broadway musical Nice Work If You Can Get It, which features songs by George and Ira.

It goes in part:

The song is a parody of the clichés of contemporary love songs; Gerald Mast in Can't Help Singin''' describes the "treacly tune" and Ira Gershwin's "refusal to write coherent words except the hackneyed rhymes to conclude every line".

Notable covers
Eliane Elias – Everything I Love (Blue Note, 2000)
Sarah Vaughan – Snowbound (Roulette, 1963)

References

External links
 Sung by Dorothy Shay on a 1954 Red Skelton Show''

Songs with music by George Gershwin
Songs with lyrics by Ira Gershwin
1931 songs